This is a list of notable events in music  that took place in the year 1997.

Specific locations
1997 in British music
1997 in Norwegian music

Specific genres
1997 in classical music
1997 in country music
1997 in heavy metal music
1997 in hip hop music
1997 in Latin music
1997 in jazz

Events

January
January 1 – Townes Van Zandt dies of a cardiac arrythmia. 
January 6 – Scottish band Texas release first single, "Say What You Want" from their 6× Platinum album "White on Blonde"
January 7 – The Spice Girls release their debut single, "Wannabe" in the U.S. and premiere the music video eighteen days later. 
January 9 – David Bowie performs his 50th Birthday Bash concert (the day after his birthday) at Madison Square Garden, New York City, USA with guests Frank Black, The Foo Fighters, Sonic Youth, Robert Smith of The Cure, Lou Reed, and Billy Corgan of The Smashing Pumpkins, with the opening act Placebo. Proceeds from the concert went to the Save the Children fund.
January 10 – James Brown receives a star on the Hollywood Walk of Fame in Hollywood, USA.
January 17–February 2 – The Big Day Out festival takes place in Australia and New Zealand, headlined by Soundgarden, The Offspring and The Prodigy. Sepultura are originally named in the lineup, but cancel their performance after the departure of former frontman Max Cavalera in December 1996. They are later replaced by Fear Factory.
January 19 – Madonna wins Best Actress In A Motion Picture, Musical Or Comedy, for her part in Evita, at the 54th annual Golden Globe Awards in the USA.
January 20 – Daft Punk releases their debut studio album, Homework.
January 28
 The Virginia Senate votes to retire "Carry Me Back to Old Virginny" as the official state song, and begins looking for a replacement.
 Clive Davis gets a star on the Hollywood Walk of Fame.

February
February 2 – Rich Mullins' musical The Canticle of the Plains receives its première in Wichita, Kansas.
February 3 – Scottish band Texas release their fourth album "White on Blonde"
February 12 – David Bowie receives a star on the Hollywood Walk of Fame in Hollywood, USA.
February 13
Michael Jackson's first son, Michael Joseph Jackson Jr., is born.
The Spice Girls knock Toni Braxton's "Unbreak My Heart" off the top spot in the US singles chart. They are the first female British group to have a US number one with their debut single.
February 20 – Ben and Jerry's introduce "Phish Food", a new flavor of ice cream named after the rock group Phish. The ingredients are chocolate ice cream, marshmallows, caramel and fish-shaped fudge.
February 24 – The Spice Girls win Best Video for "Say You'll Be There" and Best Single for "Wannabe" at the BRIT Awards. Geri Halliwell's Union Jack dress from the girls' live performance hogs the headlines the next day.
February 26 – The 39th Annual Grammy Awards are presented in New York, hosted by Ellen DeGeneres. Babyface wins the most awards with four, while Celine Dion's Falling into You wins Album of the Year and Eric Clapton's "Change the World" wins both Record of the Year and Song of the Year. LeAnn Rimes wins Best New Artist. 
February 28 – Death Row Records co-founder Suge Knight is sentenced to nine years in prison for violating his probation. He would be released in August 2001.

March
March 1
Pianist David Helfgott performs at the Boston Symphony Hall, in Boston, USA, during his world tour. The Boston Globe describes his performance as "without phrasing, form, harmonic understanding, differentiation of style and often basic accuracy; worst of all, it was without emotional content".
The jam band Phish records "Slip Stitch and Pass" live at Markthalle, Hamburg, Germany.
March 9
The Notorious B.I.G. is shot dead while sitting in the passenger seat of a car after a post Soul Train Awards party in Los Angeles, CA.
The Spice Girls become the first act in the history of the UK Top 40 singles charts to have four consecutive number one hits with "Mama"/"Who Do You Think You Are". Profits from the single go to Comic Relief and provide the biggest individual contribution of 1997.
March 10 – A Marilyn Manson concert in Columbia, South Carolina is canceled in response to pressure from religious and civic groups.
March 11 – Paul McCartney is knighted by Elizabeth II.
March 17 – Whirlwind Heat play their first show.
March 19–20 – The reunited Monkees perform two sold-out concerts at Wembley Arena in London, UK.
March 30 – The Spice Girls launch Britain's new television channel, Channel 5.

April
April 2 – Joni Mitchell is reunited with her daughter, Kilauren Gibb, whom she gave up for adoption 32 years earlier.
April 7 – Wynton Marsalis becomes the first jazz artist to win the Pulitzer Prize for Music.
April 10 – Nigel Kennedy, now calling himself simply Kennedy, returns to the stage at the Royal Festival Hall after a five-year absence from the concert stage resulting from neck surgery.
April 15 – Hanson releases "MMMBop", one of the most successful debut singles of all time, reaching number one in 27 countries.
April 25–27 – The first Terrastock festival is held in Providence, Rhode Island, USA.

May
May 3 
5ive's musical career begins after auditions are held in London, UK to find potential band members, with over 3,000 hopefuls showing up to audition.
The Spice Girls attend the Cannes Film Festival to announce their plans to hit the big screen with Spiceworld: The Movie. A photo call on top of the Hotel Martinez entrance brings the area to a standstill.
At the 42nd Eurovision Song Contest, held in Dublin's Point Theatre, the UK win with "Love Shine a Light", sung by Katrina and the Waves.
The Notorious B.I.G.'s single "Hypnotize" is #1 for three weeks.
May 6 – The Rock and Roll Hall of Fame induction ceremony is held in Cleveland at the site of the hall itself for the first time. Prior to this year, the ceremony had only been held in New York City.
May 11 – The Spice Girls perform their first British live gig for the Prince's Trust 21st anniversary concert at the Manchester Opera House. They break royal protocol by kissing the Prince of Wales (now Charles III) on the cheeks and even pinching his bottom.
May 15 – The Spice Girls' album Spice reaches number one on the US charts, making them the first British act to top the charts with a debut album.
May 21 – Radiohead releases OK Computer.
May 23 – Brainiac frontman Tim Taylor is killed in a car crash at age 29 driving to his Dayton, Ohio home. The band announces they will not continue.
May 24 – The first Ozzfest tour kicks off at the Nissan Pavilion in Washington, D.C, featuring Pantera and a reconstituted Black Sabbath with three of the four original members.
May 28 – Japanese pop singer and songwriter Miho Komatsu releases her first and debut song entitled Nazo. It is used as an opening soundtrack in popular hit anime Detective Conan.

June
June 14 – Puff Daddy and The Family's "I'll Be Missing You" single is #1 on the Hot 100 charts for the next 11 weeks, only to be replaced by The Notorious B.I.G. posthumous single "Mo Money Mo Problems", also featuring Puff Daddy.
June 24 – Disney-owned Hollywood Records drops Insane Clown Posse from their roster and pulls the album The Great Milenko after only six hours of release, in an attempt to placate the Southern Baptist Church who were threatening to boycott the company for straying from its family-friendly image. The controversy generates tremendous publicity for the band, who soon sign with Island Records.
June 29 – Missy Elliott releases the single "The Rain (Supa Dupa Fly)" from her debut album Supa Dupa Fly.

July–August
July 1 – Transfer of sovereignty over Hong Kong to China: Tan Dun's Symphony 1997: Heaven, Earth, Mankind for orchestra, biānzhōng bells, children's chorus and solo cello is premièred as part of the official ceremony.
July 5 – The first Lilith Fair tour kicks off at The Gorge Amphitheatre in George, Washington. Sarah McLachlan, Tracy Chapman and Jewel are among the performers.
July 15–20 – The second Yoyo A Go Go punk and indie rock festival opens in Olympia, Washington.
August 3 – The Black Crowes perform their last show with Johnny Colt and Marc Ford.
August 4 – Nigerian afrobeat pioneer and dissident pop star Fela Anikulapo-Kuti dies in Lagos, Nigeria, of HIV-related illness.
August 7 – Garth Brooks performs to an estimated 800,000 to one million people during a free concert given in Central Park, New York City.
August 11 – The Backstreet Boys release their second international album, Backstreet's Back.
August 12 – The Backstreet Boys release their U.S. debut album, Backstreet Boys.
August 14 – Godspeed You! Black Emperor releases debut album, F♯ A♯ ∞ 
August 16–17 – Phish perform at the two-day music festival, The Great Went, at Loring Air Force Base in Limestone, Maine, US. They play 500 minutes of music, six sets and two encores. There is an estimated attendance of between 65,000 and 70,000, and it is the top-grossing concert of the season, making over $4,000,000 in box office receipts.
August 19 – The reunited Fleetwood Mac begin a concert tour in the United States.
August 30 – "Mo Money Mo Problems" reaches #1 on the Hot 100 singles chart, making Notorious B.I.G. the first artist to achieve two posthumous #1 singles.

September–October
September 6 – Elton John performs "Candle in the Wind" at the funeral of Diana, Princess of Wales; John Tavener's "Song for Athene" is performed at the same ceremony, with soprano Lynne Dawson singing the solo part.
September 16
After a tumultuous divorce from her first husband, Mariah Carey releases the album Butterfly, which moved her sound in a more hip-hop/R&B direction.
Aaliyah releases the single "Hot Like Fire"/"The One I Gave My Heart To".
September 17 – The KLF return for 23 minutes with their performance of "Fuck the Millennium".
September 19 – While on his way to a benefit concert in Kansas, USA, Rich Mullins loses control of his Jeep, flipping the automobile and throwing both Mullins and passenger Mitch McVicker out onto the road. A tractor-trailer approaching the scene swerves to miss McVicker, striking and killing Mullins instantly. McVicker survives, but suffers major injuries.
September 20 – U2 plays at Reggio Emilia during their PopMart Tour to over 150,000 people.
September 22 – Björk releases Homogenic, moving towards a darker sound and away from her 'pixie' image.
September 23 – U2 perform a concert in Sarajevo during their PopMart Tour.
September 27 – Bob Dylan performs for Pope John Paul II at a Catholic youth event in Bologna, Italy.
September 29
The Rolling Stones release Bridges to Babylon.
The Verve release Urban Hymns. In a controversial legal dispute, the majority of their royalties and songwriting credit for their single "Bittersweet Symphony" go to The Rolling Stones.
October 7 – Everclear release their multi-platinum third album So Much for the Afterglow, containing "Father of Mine" and "I Will Buy You a New Life".
October 13 – The "Prince Igor" single, jointly performed by The Rhapsody, Warren G and Sissel Kyrkjebø is released.
October 15 – Michael Jackson ends the History World Tour, which included an attendance record of 4,500,000 fans, in Durban, South Africa.
October 22 – Namie Amuro shocks her fans when she announces that she has recently married and is three months pregnant. She subsequently begins a one-year hiatus from the music industry.
October 23 – R.E.M. drummer Bill Berry announces his departure from the group.

November–December
November 3 – The Spice Girls release Spiceworld, their second number one album, making the group the first British band since The Beatles to have two albums in the US chart at the same time. Spice and Spiceworld have amassed enough sales for one out of every two people in Britain to own a Spice Girls album.
November 4 – Shania Twain releases her album Come On Over which goes on to sell over 40 million copies worldwide to date and later became the biggest selling album in country music history and the biggest selling album by a female music artist.
November 6 – The Spice Girls make the decision to take over the running of the group and drop Simon Fuller as their manager.
November 18 – American indie rock band Modest Mouse release their second full-length album, The Lonesome Crowded West.
November 19 – Gary Glitter is arrested after images of child pornography are found on a laptop computer that he had taken in for repairs.
November 22 – INXS lead singer Michael Hutchence is found dead in a Sydney, Australia hotel room, aged 37.
November 25 – Will Smith releases his debut solo studio album Big Willie Style.
November 26 – In a performance billed as the "highest" gig on Earth, Spiritualized play in the deck of the CN Tower in Toronto, Ontario, Canada for an audience of 150 people.
November 27 – Namie Amuro releases her ninth single under Avex Trax, "Dreaming I Was Dreaming."
December 1 – Aaron Carter bursts onto the music scene at the age of 10 with the release of his debut album Aaron Carter, making him the youngest male artist in the world since Michael Jackson in 1969.
December 4-5 – Black Sabbath perform a pair of reunion shows in their hometown of Birmingham, England. They are the first full-length concerts by the original lineup of the band since 1978. 
December 26 – The Spice Girls release their big screen debut Spiceworld: The Movie, starring Richard E. Grant, Roger Moore, Elton John and Stephen Fry. The movie makes £6.8m in its first week of release.
December 31
The Home of Country Music, the Opryland USA theme park, in Nashville, Tennessee, USA closes and is subsequently demolished.
Namie Amuro performs on NHK Kōhaku Uta Gassen for the last time before beginning her maternal hiatus.

Also in 1997
Mikael Åkerfeldt and Peter Lindgren fire Johan De Farfalla from Opeth; then Anders Nordin quits the band. To replace the ex-members, Mike and Pete hire Martin Lopez and Martin Mendez.
The companies Memorex, Maxell, and TDK introduce blank recordable CDs.
The first John Lennon Songwriting Contest is held.
Rob Gommerman leaves Finger Eleven due to extensive touring.
Derrick Green replaces Max Cavalera in Sepultura.
Glenn Ljungström and Johan Larsson leave In Flames.
Big Audio Dynamite's final album Entering a New Ride, which features Ranking Roger from The Beat, gets rejected for release by their record label, so is released independently as one of the first ever well known musical downloads, for free on their website.

Bands formed
 See :Category:Musical groups established in 1997

Bands disbanded
 See :Category:Musical groups disestablished in 1997

Bands reformed

As Friends Rust (reformed with a new line-up and in a new location after breaking up earlier that year)
Blondie (reformed after broke up in 1982)
Depeche Mode (reformed after being on hiatus since 1995)
Echo & the Bunnymen (reformed after being on hiatus since 1992)
Jane's Addiction (reformed after broke up in 1991)
Sunny Day Real Estate (reformed after being on hiatus since 1995)

Albums released
 See: :Category:1997 albums

January – March

April – June

July – September

October – December

Release date unknown

Anyone Who Had a Heart: The Music of Burt Bacharach – Joe Chindamo
Alive Alive-O – The Dubliners
Anyway the Wind Blows: The Anthology – J.J. Cale (Compilation)
Back Once Again - Hilltop Hoods
Bagsy Me – The Wannadies
Ball of the Damned – Scanner
The Best of Wham!: If You Were There... – Wham!
Chloroform the One You Love – Flickerstick
Dark Dear Heart – Holly Cole
Drive – Bic Runga
The Dillinger Escape Plan – The Dillinger Escape Plan 
The Divine Wings of Tragedy – Symphony X 
The Donnas – The Donnas
Egyptology – World Party
English Boy Wonders – Big Big Train
Entering a New Ride – Big Audio Dynamite
Fallen Is Babylon – Ziggy Marley and the Melody Makers
First Encounter Tour 1996 – Cluster 
Flash Bulb Emergency Overflow Cavalcade of Remixes – Pigeonhed – Remix
From the Vaults – Prism
Go! – Fair Warning 
Greedy – Headless Chickens 
Grounded – Papa Vegas
How Ace Are Buildings – A
Low Estate – 16 Horsepower
Mirador – Tarnation
The Money Shot – Various Artists
Moonflower Plastic – Tobin Sprout

Muffins – Hoobastank
The Mysterious Tale of How I Shouted "Wrong-Eyed Jesus!" – Jim White
Okenspay Ordway: Things I Forgot to Tell Mommy (spoken word album) – Bif Naked
OnlySee – Sia Furler
Overcast! (EP & full-length) – Atmosphere
The Phantom Lodge – Diabolical Masquerade
Play the Music of Tim Rice & Andrew Lloyd Webber – Hank Marvin and The Shadows
 Progressive Attack 5 – Various Artists
 Progressive Attack 6 – Various Artists
 Progressive Attack 7 – Various Artists
Pure – 3 Colours Red
R.A.F.I (France only) – Asian Dub Foundation
Rain Without End – October Tide
Romanza – Andrea Bocelli
Shelter – Brand New Heavies
Silver Sun – Silver Sun
Smile and Wave – The Headstones
Soft Effects – Spoon 
Sydney High – Citizen King
Tiger Walk – Robben Ford 
The Truth – Prince 
Turn the Dark Off – Howie B
Un grito en el corazón – Lynda Thomas
The Union Underground – The Union Underground
Weights and Measures – Spirit of the West
When You Land Here, It's Time to Return – Flake Music
Xero – Linkin Park
You Can Play These Songs with Chords – Death Cab for Cutie

Biggest hit singles
The following songs achieved the highest positions in the charts of 1997.

Top 40 Chart hit singles

Other Chart hit singles

Notable singles

Other Notable singles

Classical music

Premieres

Compositions
Leonardo Balada – Concierto Magico for guitar and orchestra
Silvie Bodorova – Terezin Ghetto Requiem
Peter Maxwell Davies – Concerto for Piano and Orchestra
Henri Dutilleux
The Shadows of Time, for three children's voices and orchestra
Slava's Fanfare, for spatial ensemble
Lorenzo Ferrero
 Capriccio for piano and string orchestra
 Concerto for violin, cello, piano and orchestra
Storie di neve, music for the Sestriere Alpine World Ski Championships opening ceremony of 1997
Championship Suite, for large orchestra
Three Baroque Buildings
Andrew Glover – The Fickle Virgin of Seventeen Summers: A Quartet for Strings
Sofia Gubaidulina – The Canticle of the Sun
Jaakko Mäntyjärvi – Canticum Calamitatis Maritiamae
David Sawer – The Greatest Happiness Principle
Tan Dun – Symphony 1997: Heaven, Earth, Mankind
Takashi Yoshimatsu
Around the Round Ground for guitar and bells
Piano Concerto Memo Flora for piano and orchestra
And Birds Are Still... for string orchestra, Op. 72

Opera
Robert Ashley – Balseros
Antonio Braga – San Domenico di Guzman (oratorio)
Michael Daugherty – Jackie O
Peter Lieberson – Ashoka's Dream
Einojuhani Rautavaara – Aleksis Kivi

Jazz

Musical theater
1776 – Broadway revival
Annie – Broadway revival
Candide (Leonard Bernstein) – Broadway revival
Dream – Broadway production opened at the Royale Theatre and ran for 109 performances
Forever Tango – Broadway production
Jekyll & Hyde – Broadway production opened at the Plymouth Theatre and ran for 1543 performances
The Life – Broadway production opened at the Ethel Barrymore Theatre and ran for 463 performances
The Lion King – Broadway production opened at the New Amsterdam Theatre and is still running, with over 6700 performances to date, making it the third longest run in Broadway history.
The Scarlet Pimpernel – Broadway production opened at the Neil Simon Theatre and ran for 772 performances
Side Show – Broadway production opened at the Richard Rodgers Theatre and ran for 91 performances
Steel Pier – Broadway production opened at the Richard Rodgers Theatre and ran for 76 performances
Street Corner Symphony – Broadway production
Titanic – Broadway production opened at the Lunt-Fontanne Theatre and ran for 804 performances
Triumph of Love – Broadway production opened at the Royale Theatre and ran for 85 performances

Musical films
Anastasia (animated feature)
Cats Don't Dance (animated feature)
Cinderella (telefilm)
Hercules (animated feature)
Rhyme & Reason
Selena
Spiceworld
Year of the Horse

Births
January 1 – Noah Kahan, American folk musician
January 9 – Daigo Nishihata, Japanese singer (Naniwa Danshi)
January 11 – Cody Simpson, Australian surf pop singer-songwriter, musician and athlete
January 14 – Jaira Burns, American singer-songwriter
January 17 – Jack Vidgen, Australian singer and 2011 Australia's Got Talent winner
January 20 – Blueface, American rapper
January 21 – Edan Lui, Hong Kong singer
January 31 – Miyeon, South Korean singer, ((G)I-dle)
February 1  – Jihyo, South Korean singer (TWICE)
February 8
Bella Poarch, Filipino American singer, songwriter, activist
Rude-α, Japanese rapper
February 10 – Maan de Steenwinkel, Dutch singer, actress
February 11 
 Nasty C, South African rapper
 Rosé, Korean-New Zealand singer and dancer (BLACKPINK)
February 15 – Mia Boyka, Russian singer
February 16 – Ren Meguro, Japanese singer (Snow Man) 
February 23 – Shiena Nishizawa, Japanese singer
March 2 – Becky G, Mexican-American singer-songwriter, actress
March 3 – Camila Cabello, Cuban-American singer/songwriter, dancer and actress
March 4 – Daoko, Japanese singer
March 8 – Jurina Matsui - Japanese idol, actress, talent, and model (former SKE48)
March 21 – Tini Stoessel, Argentine actress, singer, songwriter, dancer and model.
March 24  – Mina, Japanese singer and dancer (TWICE)
March 26 – Glowie, Icelandic singer
March 27 – Lisa, Thai singer, dancer, rapper (BLACKPINK)
April 2 – Peach PRC, Australian pop singer, songwriter, activist, and internet personality 
April 3 – Kiana Lede, American singer-songwriter, actress, pianoist and actress
April 8 - Saygrace, Australian singer-songwriter
April 27 – Sayuki Takagi, Japanese singer
May 6 – Scene Queen - American metal musician
May 7
Irori Maeda, Japanese singer
Rico Nasty, American rapper and trap metal artist
May 11 
 Lana Condor, American actress and dancer
 Coi Leray, American rapper, singer-songwriter and dancer 
May 20 - Omar Apollo. American bilingual singer and songwriter 
May 27 – Soccer Mommy, American singer-songwriter
May 31 – Cupcakke, American rapper, LBTQ+ advocate
June 11
Kodak Black, American rapper
Jorja Smith, British singer
June 13 – 070 Shake, American rapper
June 14 – Fujii Kaze, Japanese singer
June 15 – Bali Baby, American rapper
June 17 - 070 Shake, American rapper and singer
June 21 – Rebecca Black, American singer-songwriter, YouTube artist
June 22 – Dinah Jane, American singer and member of the girl group Fifth Harmony
June 25 
 Jacquie Lee, American singer, and 2013 The Voice contestant
 Faye Webster. American singer-songwriter
June 26
Abi Ann, American singer-songwriter
Baek Ye-rin, Korean singer-songwriter and former member of 15&
June 27 – H.E.R., American singer-songwriter
July 1 – Indigo De Souza, American singer
July 30 – Finneas O'Connell, American singer-songwriter, actor, record producer and musician, brother of and collaborator with Billie Eilish
July 5 – Park Ji-min (singer, born 1997), South Korean singer-songwriter, television host and former member of 15&
July 10 – Rena Katō, Japanese singer
August 5 – Olivia Holt, American actress and singer
August 7 
 Yungblud, English alternative rock musician, singer-songwriter
 Evaluna Montaner, a Venezuelan actress, singer, music director, dancer, television presenter
August 9 – Kazuya Ohashi, Japanese singer (Naniwa Danshi)
August 10 – Sara Takatsuki, Japanese actress, model and singer
August 11 – Kanon Kimoto, former Japanese idol and actress (former SKE48)
August 16 – Greyson Chance, American singer, songwriter, and pianist
August 19 – Baby Queen, British singer-songwriter born in Durban South Africa
August 24 – Alan Walker, English-Norwegian DJ and record producer
August 25 – Maty Noyes, American singer (Kygo) 
August 26 - Cordae, American rapper, singer, and songwriter
August 28 – Bazzi (singer), American singer-songwriter (Camilla Cabello) 
September 1 – Jungkook, South Korean singer-songwriter, record producer, and member of BTS
September 2 – Sanah, Polish singer, songwriter, violinist, and composer
October 1 – Sam Verlinden, New Zealand singer and acto
October 2 - Rubi Rose, American rapper, songwriter and model
October 8 – Bella Thorne, American actress and singer
October 10 - DDG, American rapper, singer and YouTuber
October 14 – Miru Shiroma, Japanese singer and model
October 23 – Minnie, Thai singer-songwriter, record producer, and member of (G)I-dle
October 24 – Raye (singer), British singer-songwriter and activist 
November 23 – Akari Takeuchi, Japanese singer
December 5 – Maddie Poppe, American singer-songwriter and multi instrumentalist (Winner of American Idol 16)  
December 16
Snot, American rapper
Zara Larsson, Swedish singer-songwriter, musician, and activist
Nat Ćmiel (born Natasha Yelin Chang), Singaporean songwriter and producer known for the musical project, Yeule
December 20 – Suzuka Nakamoto, Japanese singer (Babymetal)
December 21
Kida, Kosovan singer
Pedro Sampaio, Brazilian singer and music producer
December 29 – Dylan Minnette, American actor, musician and singer (Wallows)

Deaths
January 1
Ivan Graziani, Italian singer-songwriter and guitarist, 51
Townes Van Zandt, country-folk musician, 52
January 2 – Randy California, rock guitarist, 45 (drowned)
January 5 – Burton Lane, composer and lyricist, 84
January 10 – Kenny Pickett, vocalist (The Creation), 54
January 18 – Keith Diamond, songwriter, 46
January 21 – Colonel Tom Parker, manager of Elvis Presley, 87
January 22
Richard Berry, songwriter (notably wrote "Louie Louie"), 61
Billy Mackenzie, Scottish vocalist of The Associates, 39 (suicide)
January 27 – Gerald Marks, American songwriter, 96
February 10 – Brian Connolly, vocalist (Sweet), 51 (liver failure)
February 23 – Tony Williams, jazz drummer, 51
March 3 – Finn Høffding, Danish composer, 97
March 9 – The Notorious B.I.G., rapper, 24 (shot)
March 10 – LaVern Baker, R & B singer, 67
March 17 – Jermaine Stewart, vocalist, 39 (AIDS)
March 24 – Harold Melvin, soul musician, 57
April 8 – Laura Nyro, singer-songwriter, 49 (ovarian cancer)
April 9
Mae Boren Axton, songwriter and music promoter, 82  
Yank Rachell, blues guitarist, 87
April 19 – Eldon Hoke, metal/punk singer and drummer, 39
May 11 – Ernie Fields, American trombonist, pianist and bandleader, 93
May 29 – Jeff Buckley, American singer-songwriter and guitarist, 30 (drowned)
June 2 – Doc Cheatham, jazz trumpeter, 91
June 4 – Ronnie Lane, member of The Small Faces, 51 (multiple sclerosis, pneumonia)
June 7 – Arthur Prysock, jazz singer, 68
June 16 – John Wolters (Dr Hook), 52 (liver cancer)
June 19 – Bobby Helms, country singer, 63
June 20 – Lawrence Payton (The Four Tops), 59
June 23 – Prince Nico Mbarga, Nigerian highlife musician, 47
June 26 – Israel Kamakawiwoʻole, Hawaiian musician, 38
July 5 – Mrs. Elva Miller, American singer, 89
August 1 – Sviatoslav Richter, pianist, 82
August 2 – Fela Kuti, Nigerian musician and composer, 58 (Kaposi's sarcoma)
August 5 – Don Steele, American disc jockey, 61
August 10 – Conlon Nancarrow, composer, 84
August 12 – Luther Allison, blues guitarist, 57
August 16 – Ustad Nusrat Fateh Ali Khan, qawwali singer and world music ambassador, 48
September 5 – Sir Georg Solti, conductor, 84
September 8 – Derek Taylor, press agent for The Beatles, 65
September 17 – Anthony Franchini, Italian American guitarist, 99
September 18 – Jimmy Witherspoon, blues singer, 77
September 19 – Rich Mullins, singer, 41
September 28 – Munir Bashir, musician and oud player, 66–67
October 5 – Arthur Tracy, singer, 98
October 12 – John Denver, American folk singer-songwriter and folk rock musician, 53 (air crash)
October 19 – Glen Buxton, guitarist for the original Alice Cooper Band, 49 (pneumonia)
October 20 – Henry Vestine, guitarist (Canned Heat), 52
November 3 – Ronald Barnes, carillonist, 70
November 6 – Epic Soundtracks, English singer-songwriter, drummer of Swell Maps, Crime and the City Solution and These Immortal Souls, 38
November 12 – Carlos Surinach, Spanish-American composer and conductor, 82
November 20 – Robert Palmer, writer, musicologist, clarinetist and producer, 52
November 22 – Michael Hutchence, singer of INXS, 37 (suicide by hanging)
December 1 – Stephane Grappelli, French violinist, 89
December 2 – Michael Hedges, composer and guitarist, 43 (car accident)
December 16 – Nicolette Larson, pop singer ("Lotta Love"), 45 (cerebral edema)
December 19 – Jimmy Rogers, blues musician, 73
December 21 – Amie Comeaux, American singer and actress, 21 (traffic accident)
December 28 – Henry Barraud, French composer, 97
December 31 – Floyd Cramer, pianist, 64

Awards
 1997 Country Music Association Awards
 Eurovision Song Contest 1997: won by Katrina and the Waves (UK) with the song "Love Shine a Light".
Gospel Music Hall of Fame: Inductees include Gloria Gaither, and Billy Ray Hearn (founder of Myrrh Records).
 Grammy Awards of 1997
 Mercury Music Prize: Awarded to Roni Size/Reprazent for the album New Forms.
 1997 MTV Video Music Awards
 Rock and Roll Hall of Fame: The following artists are inducted: The (Young) Rascals; the Bee Gees; Buffalo Springfield; Crosby, Stills and Nash; The Jackson 5; Joni Mitchell; and Parliament-Funkadelic.

See also
 1997 in music (UK)
 :Category:Record labels established in 1997
 Triple J Hottest 100, 1997

References

 
20th century in music
Music by year